Lütau is an Amt ("collective municipality") in the district of Lauenburg, in Schleswig-Holstein, Germany. Its seat is in Lauenburg/Elbe, itself not part of the Amt.

The Amt Lütau consists of the following municipalities (population in 2005 between brackets):

Basedow (678)
Buchhorst (163)
Dalldorf (353)
Juliusburg (184)
Krukow (196)
Krüzen (337)
Lanze (407)
Lütau (677)
Schnakenbek (846)
Wangelau (220)

References

Ämter in Schleswig-Holstein